The Central Coast & Newcastle Line is a NSW TrainLink passenger train service that runs along the Main North railway line in New South Wales, connecting the state's two largest cities, Sydney and Newcastle.

Description of route

The route traverses the Main West and Main South railway line routes until Strathfield, where it diverts north and follows the route of the Main North line until Broadmeadow, before diverting east along the route of the Newcastle branch line. To Newcastle Interchange The line is electrified at 1500 V DC throughout, and is primarily double track, although there are refuge loops at Hawkesbury River, Gosford, Wyong, Awaba, and Sulphide Junction (between Cockle Creek and Cardiff). Some services terminate at Gosford and Wyong.

Sometimes when there is trackwork between Strathfield and Hornsby, trains will operate via the North Shore line to Hornsby, then follow the Main North railway line as normal.

History
Prior to electrification of the route, steam hauled passenger trains were varied. From November 1929 until April 1988, the Newcastle Flyer operated on the route. From the time the line was electrified, services to Gosford were hauled by 46 class locomotives, their sphere of operation increasing as the wires were extended. After electrification to Newcastle, services were taken over by U and V sets. Later the U sets were replaced by K and G sets which in turn were replaced by H sets.

The last electric locomotives were withdrawn in March 1998 with all services operated by Electric multiple unit stock.

The section of the Newcastle railway line between Hamilton and Newcastle was closed on 25 December 2014. Until the opening of Newcastle Interchange in 2017, Hamilton formed a temporary terminus. The closed section between Wickham and Newcastle was replaced with the Newcastle Light Rail that opened in February 2019.

Services
Most all-stations trains have four carriages, with the first and last car being quiet carriages. Peak-hour and most express services usually have eight cars, with quiet carriages on the first, last, and the two middle carriages.

Services depart from Central (Sydney Terminal) and are operated by 4/8 car H sets (OSCARs) and 8 car V sets.

From 2023, all services are to be taken over by 4 and 6 car D Sets. This will free up H sets for transferal to suburban railway work.

Stopping patterns 
Weekday Peak Hours

Additional services operate between Central (i) and Gosford/Wyong in peak. 

Some services travel via the North Shore line and extend to Gosford and Wyong via Gordon

Weekday Off-Peak

 Express services: Central (i), Strathfield, Epping, Hornsby, Woy Woy, Gosford, Tuggerah, Wyong, Morriset, Fassifern, Cardiff, Broadmeadow, Hamilton, Newcastle Interchange (operates every 60 minutes)
 All stops: Central (i), Strathfield, Epping, Hornsby, Berowra, then all stations to Newcastle Interchange (operates every 60 minutes)

Weekends

 Central (i), Strathfield, Epping, Hornsby, Woy Woy, Gosford, Tuggerah, Wyong then all stops to Newcastle (every 120 minutes)
 Central (i), Strathfield, Epping, Hornsby, Woy Woy, Gosford, Tuggerah, Wyong, Wyee, Morriset, Fassifern, Cardiff, Broadmeadow, Hamilton, Newcastle Interchange (every 120 minutes)
 Central (i), Strathfield, Epping, Hornsby, Berowra, then all stations to Wyong (every 60 minutes)

Upgrades

Completed
The line was electrified to Gosford in January 1960, Wyong in April 1982 and Newcastle in June 1984.

As part of the Northern Sydney Freight Corridor project the following projects were completed: The projects were:

Proposed

Glendale station
A railway station is proposed to be constructed in Glendale as part of the Lake Macquarie Transport Interchange project. The station will be located between Cockle Creek and Cardiff railway station and will have connections to buses. An extension of Glendale Drive leading to the proposed station has been built and completed in June 2017. The station, however, has not commenced construction.

New Warnervale station
A new station is proposed for Warnervale. The draft Central Coast Transportation Strategy stated that construction of the new railway station was to be completed by 2016. In October 2014 there were some differences between Wyong Council and the State Government over how a strategic piece of land should be developed at Warnervale.

Stations
This table does not include the services which run via the North Shore line and extend to Gosford and Wyong via Gordon.

Patronage

See also
 Main Northern Line- for details of history and construction.
 Newcastle Branch line- for the branch line between Broadmeadow and Newcastle.
 Woy Woy Tunnel.
 Hawkesbury River Railway Bridge.

References

Further reading
 The Short North, Singleton C.C. Australian Railway Historical Society Bulletin, May et seq, 1965

Transport on the Central Coast (New South Wales)
Rail transport in the Hunter Region
Newcastle, New South Wales
City of Lake Macquarie
Standard gauge railways in Australia
Railway lines opened in 1887
NSW TrainLink
Hornsby Shire
1887 establishments in Australia